Metro Exodus is a first-person shooter video game developed by 4A Games and published by Deep Silver. It is the third installment in the Metro video game trilogy based on Dmitry Glukhovsky's novels, following the events of Metro 2033 and Metro: Last Light. It was released in 2019 for PlayStation 4, Windows, Xbox One and Stadia and in 2020 for Amazon Luna. A Linux and macOS conversion was released in 2021. An enhanced version of the game was released for Windows on 6 May 2021, and later for PlayStation 5 and Xbox Series X/S on 18 June 2021. The game received generally favorable reviews from critics and sold 6 million units by February 2022.

Gameplay

Metro Exodus is a first-person shooter game with survival horror and stealth elements. Set in the post-apocalyptic wasteland of the former Russian Federation and Republic of Kazakhstan, the player must cope with the new hazards and engage in combat against mutated creatures and hostile humans. The player wields an arsenal of hand-made weaponry which can be customised through scavenging materials and a crafting system. The game features a mixture of linear levels and open world environments. It includes a dynamic weather system, a day-night cycle, and environments that change along with the seasons as the story progresses. It is set over the course of one whole in-game year.

Synopsis

Setting
Metro Exodus is set in the year 2035, one year after the events of Metro: Last Light, on a post-apocalyptic Earth that has been devastated by a nuclear war. The game continues the story from Metro: Last Lights "Redemption" ending. Similar to the previous two entries, the player assumes the role of Artyom, who flees the Moscow Metro and sets off on a journey with his allies to the far east, on a locomotive called the Aurora. The story takes place over the course of one year, starting with a harsh nuclear winter in the Metro. Another major character, returning from the previous game and the book Metro 2035, is Anna - who is now Artyom's wife. Miller, Anna's father and leader of the Spartan Order, returns from previous games and novels.

Plot
After the attack on D6, Artyom becomes disillusioned with the constant infighting and corruption within the Metro and leaves the Spartan Order. He becomes obsessed with proving that other human survivors exist outside of Moscow and makes numerous dangerous expeditions to the surface, much to Anna's concern and Miller's frustration. On one such expedition with Anna, they witness a working train running on the surface. Before they can follow it, they are captured by Hansa soldiers, along with a group of people who claim to be from outside of Moscow. The Hansa soldiers execute the other prisoners, and Artyom is shot and left for dead, taking Anna to their base. Surviving the gunshot, Artyom follows the soldiers to rescue Anna, and in the process inadvertently destroys a signal jammer that was blocking all communications going in and out of Moscow. Radio transmissions from all over the world begin to be picked up, and Artyom and Anna realise humanity has not gone extinct. They escape by stealing one of Hansa's locomotives, the Aurora, with the aid of a defected Hansa train engineer called Yermak.

As the train leaves, the Spartan Order moves in to retake it and are shocked and confused at Artyom and Anna's presence. Knowing that Hansa will have all of them put to death for knowing the truth, Miller concludes that the Spartans' best chance of survival is to flee Moscow. Once outside the city, he reveals to the others that while many of Russia's cities were bombed, the war did not end and NATO proceeded to occupy what was left of the nation. To prevent NATO from attacking Moscow, the Russian leadership decided to secretly jam all communications to make the outside world believe nobody had survived. They receive a radio broadcast from Moscow Defense Command calling for survivors to rally at the "Ark", located at Mount Yamantau. Miller decides to head there, believing that the Ark is where the Russian government has rebuilt itself.

After crossing the cult-controlled Volga River, the Spartans reach the Yamantau base. They discover the base's service and construction crew have devolved into cannibals who lure survivors in with the false promise of safety. Artyom and the Spartans manage to fight their way out and escape, but Miller's faith in Russia is shattered when he discovers that the government never took refuge in Yamantau and did not survive the war, and thus the Spartans are left wondering what to do next. Using a map they recovered from Yamantau, they decide to travel to a satellite communication center near the Caspian Sea in the hopes of gaining access to a satellite to find habitable land to settle. At the dried up remains of the Caspian Sea, the Spartans steal water and fuel from the local bandits while obtaining an updated satellite map.

As the Spartans continue on their journey, Anna begins to cough up blood, fearing the cause was accidentally breathing poison gas during the journey. They decide to scout a nearby taiga forest valley to see if it is suitable to settle. While scouting the forest, Artyom is caught between two rival survivor factions, and he discovers that the dam protecting the valley from radiation is on the verge of failing, making the area uninhabitable. Artyom returns to the train to learn Anna's condition has worsened. The Spartans detour to the heavily-irradiated city of Novosibirsk, the closest location where an antidote may be found.

Miller and Artyom decide to head into the city alone to search for the antidote despite the risk. They enter the Novosibirsk Metro and find a young boy named Kirill, one of the last of the Novosibirsk survivors, who explains that his father left on a mission to obtain a map marking the location of a clean, habitable area. Miller and Artyom split up, with Miller going to find the map and Artyom searching for the antidote. He manages to recover the antidote, but is gravely wounded by a mutant and absorbs a heavy dose of radiation. Artyom, Miller, and Kirill return to the train with the map and the antidote, but Miller dies of radiation poisoning on the way back after using a dose of anti-radiation serum meant for himself to save Artyom. The rest of the Spartans donate their own blood to give Artyom a critical blood transfusion. Anna is cured with the antidote and with the map, the Spartans settle on the shores of Lake Baikal, which is completely free from radiation.

Artyom's ultimate fate depends on the choices the player made during the journey; In the bad ending, Artyom dies from the radiation poisoning, and the Spartans and a grieving Anna hold a funeral for him and Miller while Artyom's and Miller's spirits awaken on a dilapidated version of the Aurora, remaining in the ghostly purgatory for eternity. In the good ending, Artyom survives. Miller is buried and Artyom is selected to take his place as leader of the Spartan Order. Now with a home free from radiation, Artyom decides to return to Moscow and reveal the truth of the world to the survivors of the Metro.

The Two Colonels
While Artyom goes to find the cure for Anna's illness in Novosibirsk, Miller begins retracing the steps of Kirill's father, Colonel Vyacheslav "Slava" Khlebnikov, to find the satellite map. One year prior, Slava works as a soldier protecting the Novosibirsk Metro while raising Kirill. Meanwhile, the Novosibirsk Metro government, OSKOM, makes plans to evacuate the Metro but there is not enough anti-radiation serum to protect the entire population. As a result, OSKOM begins forcibly confiscating serum from the populace, causing civil unrest. Civil war breaks out in the Metro, forcing Slava to defend OSKOM headquarters from the rebels. However, General Anatoliy "Tolya" Vinogradov deploys poison gas during the battle, killing almost everybody in the station. When Slava confronts him, Tolya reveals that OSKOM leadership has already taken what serum is left and fled, deciding to flood the Metro with poison gas to mercy kill the rest of the population. However, bitter that he was left behind, Tolya orders his men to destroy the OSKOM evacuation train before committing suicide. With no other choice, Slava descends into a mutant-infested bunker to retrieve the map leading to Lake Baikal. He finds the map, but succumbs to radiation poisoning after losing his serum dose. In the present, Miller enters the bunker and finds Slava's body and the map. He assures Slava that he did not die in vain, and promises to get Kirill out of Novosibirsk before leaving.

Sam's Story
After the Spartan Order settles in Lake Baikal, one of the Spartans, former U.S. Marine guard Samuel "Sam" Taylor, decides to find a way to return to his home in San Diego to see if his father survived the nuclear war. Parting ways with the Spartan Order, Sam travels to the port city of Vladivostok where he meets Captain Eduard "Ed" Baranov. Baranov points Sam to an intact nuclear submarine, the Mayflower, which can take Sam back to the United States. However, Sam and Ed are separated by a mutant attack and Sam is apprehended by men working for Tom, a fellow American. Tom explains that he was an arms dealer who was stranded in Russia after the nuclear bombs fell, and asks Sam to find Ed since he is the only person who knows how to refuel the Mayflower. Ed does not trust Tom's intentions with the Mayflower, especially since it is still armed with nuclear missiles and his crew has gone missing, but Sam convinces him to negotiate a deal with Tom. Sam and Ed travel to a nearby abandoned naval base to recover the fuel rods needed to power the Mayflower. However, Ed is still mistrustful of Tom, and he asks Sam to use the opportunity to sabotage the Mayflower, even if it means sacrificing his chance to return home. Suddenly, Tom's lieutenant Klim betrays him and attacks the Mayflower, forcing Sam, Ed, and Tom to work together. Sam kills Klim and the Mayflower begins to sail out of port. Sam then has the choice of sabotaging the Mayflower or leaving it intact.

If Sam does not sabotage the Mayflower, Tom takes him to San Diego as promised with the firepower of the Mayflower at his command. If Sam sabotages the Mayflower, the submarine explodes and sinks, killing both Ed and Tom. Sam remains in Vladivostok, but is happy knowing nobody can use the nuclear weapons the Mayflower was carrying and resolves to find another way back home.

Development and release

Metro Exodus is developed by 4A Games. Development of the game began in 2014 at 4A Games' studios in Malta and Kyiv. The game uses the 4A Engine. Metro Exodus was announced on 11 June 2017 at Microsoft's press conference during E3 2017. The game was released for PlayStation 4, Windows, and Xbox One on 15 February 2019, followed by a Stadia version on 19 November 2019, as part of that system's launch. On 14 April 2021, a Linux and macOS conversion was released. The first expansion pack, The Two Colonels, was released on 20 August 2019, followed by the second expansion, titled Sam's Story, on 11 February 2020. On 6 May 2021, an Enhanced version of the game was released on Windows 10 and was later released on PlayStation 5 and Xbox Series X and Series S on 18 June 2021.

The game features a Dolby Atmos soundtrack.

Epic Games Store controversy 
On 28 January 2019, it was announced that the PC release would be exclusive to the Epic Games Store for one year, with the publisher citing the platform's more favourable revenue split. The game's pre-sales were discontinued on Steam following the announcement, with existing Steam digital purchases still being fulfilled. The decision caused controversy, and resulted in a large number of players calling for a boycott of the game and review bombing the franchise's previous games on Steam. The physical retail editions of the game, previously announced for Steam, were also changed to use Epic Games Store, despite many copies already being preordered by customers.

One of the game's developers was criticised in the gaming press for stating on a forum that if Metro Exodus did not sell well on the Epic Games Store, its sequels may become console exclusives. 4A Games released a statement that these views did not represent those of the company.

Reception

Metro Exodus was released to "generally favourable" reviews, according to the review aggregator Metacritic.

IGN praised the slow pacing of the game, saying it stood out from other first-person shooters, "This is not a run-and-gun experience; it's a stay-low-and-go-slow crawl through some of the most atmospheric and detail-rich settings I've ever experienced in a story-driven shooter". While praising the weapon modding system, GameSpot criticized the player movement, feeling it was out of place in an open world setting, "Navigating isn't entirely enjoyable whether it be because of the sluggish rowboats in the Volga or empty lands of the Caspian. It sometimes feels as if Metro's methodical movement was thrown into much larger spaces it wasn't meant for". GamesRadar+ praised the gameplay and appreciated the open overground environments compared to previous titles as a refreshing take on the series, summarizing their review by saying it was "one of the best shooters ... played in years".

Sales 
In its release month, Metro: Exodus claimed the second spot on the UK's sales charts. Metro: Exodus sold 50% more copies than its predecessor Metro: Last Light. In Japan, approximately 17,513 physical units for PS4 were sold during its launch week, making Metro: Exodus the 7th best-selling game of any format. The game debuted at the number one position on the weekly Switzerland retail charts.

Up to the end of its release quarter on 31 March 2019, the game generated €58 million for publisher Deep Silver. After the release on Steam on 15 February 2020, the game sold more than 200,000 copies within a couple of days. By February 2022, the game had sold 6 million units.

Awards

References

External links
 

2019 video games
Fiction set in 2036
Anti-war video games
Deep Silver games
First-person shooters
2010s horror video games
Video games about cults
Metro 2033
PlayStation 4 games
PlayStation 4 Pro enhanced games
PlayStation 5 games
Post-apocalyptic video games
Stadia games
Single-player video games
Video game sequels
Video games about cannibalism
Video games about nuclear war and weapons
Video games based on novels
Video games developed in Ukraine
Video games set in Kazakhstan
Video games set in Moscow
Video games set in Russia
Video games set in the 2030s
Video games with alternate endings
Windows games
Works set in Siberia
Xbox One games
Xbox One X enhanced games
Xbox Series X and Series S games
Linux games